Encephalartos mackenziei is a species of cycad in South Sudan. It is found in the Didinga Hills of Namorunyang State.

Description
It is a cycad with a stem up to 3.5 m tall and 35 cm in diameter, first erect, then decombent, characterized by the presence of numerous secondary stems originating from basal shoots. [2] The pinnate leaves, arranged like a crown at the apex of the stem, are up to 1.5 m long, composed of numerous pairs of obovate, coriaceous, tomentose leaves, 15–17 cm long, with 3-5 spines on the upper margin and a pungent apex, inserted on the rachis with an angle of 45°.
It is a dioecious species, with male specimens showing up to 10 cylindrical, pedunculated cones, about 22 cm long and 9 cm broad, light green in color that turns towards yellow when ripe, and female specimens with 1-2 long, ovoid cones about 40 cm and wide 16-18 cm, initially light green in color, from olive green to brownish yellow when ripe.
The seeds are roughly ovoid, 3.5 cm, covered with an orange-red seed coat.

References

External links

mackenziei